OGK-2 (Wholesale generating company №2) is a Russian power generation company. Majority of the company's stock is owned by Gazprom.

History
In 2005, five thermal power plants with installed capacity about 8,700 MW were merged into single company. The power output of these plants in 2007 was around 48 TWh.

In April 2010, Gazprom, the major shareholder of OGK-2 and OGK-6, announced a plan to merge these companies.  OGK-2 issued 26.59 billion new shares (81.2% of existing share capital) which were used for conversion of OGK-6 shares at a ratio of 1.2141 OGK-6 to 1 OGK-2 share.  The merger was completed by 1 November 2011.

Operations
OGK-2 operates following power stations:
Pskov GRES – 430 MW
Serov GRES – 526 MW
Stavropol GRES – 2,400 MW
Surgut GRES-1 - 2,059 MW
Troitsk GRES – 3,280 MW
Novocherkassk GRES – 2,112 MW,
Kirishi GRES – 2,100 MW
Ryazan GRES – 2,650 MW
Krasnoyarsk-2 GRES - 1,250 MW
Cherepovets GRES - 1,050 MW
GRES-24 - 310 MW (at Novomichurinsk; merged with Ryazan GRES in November 2008)

Installed capacity of the company is 17,750 MW.

See also

 Inter RAO

References

External links
 

Electric power companies of Russia
Companies established in 2005
Companies listed on the Moscow Exchange
Gazprom subsidiaries
Companies based in Stavropol Krai